General Campbell may refer to:

United Kingdom
Alexander Campbell (died 1832) (c. 1750–1832), British Army general
Alexander Douglas Campbell (1899–1980), British Army major general
Sir Alexander Campbell, 1st Baronet (1760–1824), British Army lieutenant general
Archibald Campbell (British Army officer, born 1739) (1739–1791), British Army major general
Archibald Campbell (British Army officer, born 1774) (1774–1838), British Army major general
Sir Archibald Campbell, 1st Baronet (1769–1843), British Army general
Archibald Campbell, 1st Duke of Argyll (1658–1703), British Army general
Archibald Campbell, 1st Marquess of Argyll (1607–1661), Scottish general in the Scottish Civil War
Barrington Campbell, 3rd Baron Blythswood (1845–1918), British Army major general
Colin Campbell (British Army officer, born 1754) (1754–1814), British Army lieutenant general
Colin Campbell (British Army officer, born 1776) (1776–1847), British Army lieutenant general 
Colin Campbell, 1st Baron Clyde (1792–1863), British Army general
David Campbell (British Army officer) (1869–1936), British Army general
Duncan Campbell (British Army general) (1763–1837), British Army general
Frederick Campbell (British Army officer, born 1780) (1780–1866), British Army general
Gunning Campbell (1863–1920), Royal Marines major general
Sir Guy Campbell, 1st Baronet (1786–1849), British Army major general
Henry Frederick Campbell (1769–1856), British Army general
James Campbell (British Army officer, died 1745) (c. 1680–1745), British Army lieutenant general
James Campbell (Royal Marines officer) (1761–1840), Royal Marines major general
Sir James Campbell, 1st Baronet (1763–1819), British Army lieutenant general
Jock Campbell (British Army officer) (1894–1942), British Army major general
John Campbell (1802–1878) (1802–1878), British Army general
John Campbell, 1st Marquess of Breadalbane (1762–1834), British Army lieutenant general
John Campbell, 2nd Duke of Argyll (1680–1743), British Army general
John Campbell, 4th Duke of Argyll (c. 1693–1770), British Army general
John Campbell, 4th Earl of Loudoun (1705–1782), British Army general
John Campbell, 5th Duke of Argyll (1723–1806), British Army general
John Hasluck Campbell (1855–1921), British Army brigadier general
John Vaughan Campbell (1876–1944), British Army brigadier general
Sir John Campbell, 1st Baronet (1836–1915), British Army major general
Neil Campbell (British Army officer) (1776–1827), British Army major general
Patrick Campbell (British Army officer, born 1684) (c. 1684–1751), British Army lieutenant general
Shawn W. Campbell (fl. 1990s–2020s), U.S. Air Force brigadier general
Victor Campbell (British Army officer) (1905–1990), British Army major general
Walter Campbell (British Army officer) (1864–1936), British Army lieutenant general
William Pitcairn Campbell (1856–1933), British Army lieutenant general

United States
Alexander William Campbell (general) (1828–1893), Confederate States Army brigadier general
Boniface Campbell (1895–1988), U.S. Army major general
Charles C. Campbell (general) (1948–2016), U.S. Army general
Charles Thomas Campbell (1823–1895), Union Army brigadier general
Craig Campbell (politician) (born 1952), Alaska National Guard lieutenant general
Donald M. Campbell Jr. (born 1955), U.S. Army lieutenant general
Harold D. Campbell (1895–1955), U.S. Marine Corps major general 
James L. Campbell (born 1949), U.S. Army lieutenant general
James R. Campbell (Illinois politician) (1853–1924), U.S. Volunteers brigadier general
John F. Campbell (general) (born 1957), U.S. Army general
John Allen Campbell (1835–1880), Union Army brevet brigadier general
Kevin T. Campbell (1973–2011), U.S. Army lieutenant general
Levin H. Campbell Jr. (1886–1976), U.S. Army lieutenant general
Murdock A. Campbell (1889–1972), Vermont National Guard major general
William Campbell (general) (1745–1781), Virginia Militia brigadier general
William B. Campbell (1807–1867), Union Army brigadier general
William J. Campbell (general) (1931–2017), U.S. Air Force lieutenant general

Others
Angus Campbell (general) (fl. 1980s–2020s), Australian Army general
Ian Ross Campbell (1900–1997), Australian Army major general
Kathryn Campbell (fl.2000s–2020s), Australian Army Reserve major general
Lloyd Campbell (born c. 1947), Canadian Air Force lieutenant general

See also
Attorney General Campbell (disambiguation)